Erasmus Jerel Myers (born July 18, 1981) is a former professional American, Canadian and Arena football wide receiver who is currently a free agent. He was signed as an undrafted free agent by the Buffalo Bills in 2003. He played college football for the LSU Tigers.

Myers has also been a member of the Washington Redskins, New Orleans VooDoo, Kansas City Brigade and BC Lions.

He is now a Physical Education teacher at Stafford Municipal School District in Stafford, TX.

External links
BC Lions bio

1981 births
Living people
People from Houston
Players of American football from Texas
American football wide receivers
American players of Canadian football
Canadian football wide receivers
LSU Tigers football players
Buffalo Bills players
Washington Redskins players
BC Lions players
New Orleans VooDoo players
Kansas City Brigade players
Oklahoma City Yard Dawgz players